Paulina Flores (born 1988) is a Chilean writer.

In

Works
 Qué vergüenza, Hueders, Santiago, 2015 (Seix Barral, Barcelona, 2016), containing 9 stories:
 "Qué vergüenza", "Teresa", "Talcahuano", "Olvidar a Freddy", "Tía Nana", "Últimas vacaciones", "Espíritu americano", "Laika", and "Afortunada de mí"

Awards and recognitions
 National Fund for the Promotion of Books and Reading Grant (2011)
 Roberto Bolaño Prize for the story "Qué vergüenza" (2014)
 2016 Santiago Municipal Literature Award for the story compilation Qué vergüenza
 Art Critics Circle Award for the book Qué vergüenza

References

1988 births
21st-century Chilean women writers
21st-century Chilean short story writers
Chilean schoolteachers
Living people
University of Chile alumni
Writers from Santiago
Chilean women short story writers